George Bennard (February 4, 1873 – October 10, 1958) was an American hymn composer and preacher. He is best known for composing the famous hymn, "The Old Rugged Cross".

Early years 
Bennard was born in the coal-mining and iron-production town of Youngstown, Ohio.  When he was still a child, his parents relocated the family to Albion, Michigan. Some time later, they moved again to Lucas, Iowa. Although the young Bennard aspired to become a Christian evangelist, he was compelled to support his mother and sisters after his father died suddenly.

Evangelical and musical careers 
After marrying, Bennard became active in the Salvation Army and preached throughout the United States and Canada. He was ordained as a minister in the Methodist Episcopal Church. He spent much of his life in Michigan and Wisconsin. As a well-regarded author of Christian hymns, his most famous work is "The Old Rugged Cross". He wrote ‘The Old Rugged Cross’ at Albion College, in Albion, Michigan, at 1101 East Michigan Avenue, a building that later became the Delta Tau Delta fraternity house. It has since been torn down, but a historical marker is on the site. Bennard retired to Reed City, Michigan, and the town maintains a museum dedicated to his life and ministry. He died in Reed City, Michigan, where the local Chamber of Commerce erected a cross near his home.

Bennard is buried at Inglewood Park Cemetery in Inglewood, California.

References

External links
 Historical Albion Michigan

1873 births
1958 deaths
American male composers
American composers
American Methodist clergy
People from Reed City, Michigan
Musicians from Youngstown, Ohio
Burials at Inglewood Park Cemetery
People from Albia, Iowa
People from Lucas County, Iowa